Tim Pütz and Michael Venus defeated Pierre-Hugues Herbert and Nicolas Mahut in the final, 6–3, 6–7(4–7), [11–9], to win the doubles title at the 2021 Paris Masters.

Félix Auger-Aliassime and Hubert Hurkacz were the defending champions, but chose not to participate this year.

Seeds
All seeds received a bye into the second round.

Draw

Finals

Top half

Bottom half

References

External links
Main draw

Doubles